Diego da Silva Giaretta (born November 27, 1983), commonly known as Diego Giaretta, born in Cascavel is a Brazilian footballer, as centre-back or left-back for Cascavel.

Career
Plays in the Atlético Clube Goianiense.

Career statistics
(Correct )

Honours
Botafogo
Campeonato Brasileiro Série B: 2015

Contract
 Grêmio Prudente.

References

External links
 
 Diego Giaretta at playmakerstats.com (English version of zerozero.pt)
 

1983 births
Living people
Brazilian footballers
People from Cascavel
Association football defenders
Campeonato Brasileiro Série A players
China League One players
K League 1 players
Brazilian expatriate footballers
Brazilian expatriate sportspeople in Spain
Brazilian expatriate sportspeople in South Korea
Brazilian expatriate sportspeople in China
Expatriate footballers in Spain
Expatriate footballers in South Korea
Expatriate footballers in China
Clube Náutico Marcílio Dias players
Grêmio Foot-Ball Porto Alegrense players
CD Tenerife players
Brusque Futebol Clube players
Clube Atlético Metropolitano players
Grêmio Barueri Futebol players
Botafogo de Futebol e Regatas players
Incheon United FC players
Atlético Clube Goianiense players
Cangzhou Mighty Lions F.C. players
Criciúma Esporte Clube players
Vila Nova Futebol Clube players
Guarani FC players
Mirassol Futebol Clube players
Sportspeople from Paraná (state)